Aby for Claythorpe was a railway station on the East Lincolnshire Railway which served the hamlets of Aby and Claythorpe in Lincolnshire between 1848 and 1961. It originally opened as Claythorpe, but was renamed in 1885. Withdrawal of goods facilities took place in 1961, on the same day that the station was closed to passengers. The line through the station is closed.

History
The station was opened on 3 September 1848 as Claythorpe after the settlement of Claythorpe, and was renamed in November 1885 to Aby after the nearby hamlet of Aby. This section was the last to be completed in September 1848 at an agreed cost of £123,000. The station was provided with parallel platforms to the north of a skew level crossing, with the stationmaster's house situated on the south side of the crossing on the down side. Adjacent to the stationmaster's house, which contained a booking office, was a short low platform which may have been used by rail motors. On the opposite side of the line was a signal box bearing the name Aby, which may have been the shortest name for any signal box in the country. The box controlled the crossing and a goods yard with a goods shed and a 1½-ton crane. The station closed to passengers on the same day.

Present day
The stationmaster's house has survived as a private residence, and the goods shed is still standing. The low platform in front of the stationmaster's house is still extant, but the parallel platforms have been removed and the land returned to agriculture.  To the south, the bridge which carried the line over Great Eau also remains.

References

Sources

External links
 Aby for Claythorpe station on navigable O. S. map
 Image of the goods shed

Disused railway stations in Lincolnshire
Railway stations in Great Britain closed in 1961
Railway stations in Great Britain opened in 1848
Former Great Northern Railway stations